Thomas Heurtel (born 10 April 1989) is a French professional basketball player who plays for Zenit Saint Petersburg of the VTB United League.

Professional career

France (2007–2010)
Heurtel rose through the ranks at the French club Élan Béarnais Pau-Orthez, and he played in the senior men's first team of the club for two seasons. In the 2008–09 season, he won the French League's Rising Star Award.

One year later, after the relegation of Pau-Orthez, he signed with the French club ASVEL Basket, but he played on loan with French club Strasbourg IG.

Spain (2010–2014)
In the summer of 2010, Heurtel left France, to join the Spanish League club Meridiano Alicante.

In 2011, Heurtel signed with Spanish club Baskonia, and with them he debuted in the top-tier level European-wide league, the EuroLeague.

Turkey (2014–2017)
On 27 December 2014, just before the start of the Top 16 stage of the 2014–15 Euroleague season, Anadolu Efes bought him to Baskonia and Heurtel signed a contract until June 2017 with Turkish club Anadolu Efes, of the Turkish Basketball Super League (BSL). With Efes, Heurtel needed just two months to win his first club title, as he helped his team to win the Turkish Cup title. Additionally, Heurtel was named the Turkish Cup Final MVP. At the beginning of the next season, Heurtel helped Anadolu Efes to beat Pınar Karşıyaka to win the Turkish President´s Cup, his second title with Efes.

In the 2016–17 season, Heurtel was named the EuroLeague MVP of the Month, for the first time in his career, after averaging 16.7 points and 10.7 assists in the month of February.

Return to Spain (2017–2021)

On 22 June 2017 Heurtel signed a two-year deal with FC Barcelona Lassa of the Liga ACB. On 18 February 2018 Heurtel won the Copa del Rey with FC Barcelona Lassa and was named MVP of the tournament.

On July 5, 2019, Heurtel resigned with FC Barcelona for two more years, with an option to extend it until the end of the 2021–22 campaign.

Return to France (2021)
On February 24, 2021, Heurtel signed with ASVEL of the French LNB Pro A for the rest of the season.

Second return to Spain (2021–2022)
On July 6, 2021, Heurtel signed a one-year deal with Real Madrid of the Liga ACB and the EuroLeague. He was sidelined in the latter stretch of the season due to disciplinary reasons. On June 29, 2022, Heurtel officially parted ways with the Spanish club.

National team career
Heurtel played with the French under-20 national team at the 2008 FIBA Europe Under-20 Championship, and at the 2009 FIBA Europe Under-20 Championship, where he won a silver medal. He has also been a member of the senior men's French national basketball team. With France, he played at the EuroBasket 2013, where he won a gold medal, at the 2014 FIBA Basketball World Cup, where he won a bronze medal, and at the 2016 Summer Olympics.

After Heurtel broke his agreement not to play for any Russian or Belarusian team in order to represent France at EuroBasket 2022 -- by joining a Russian team in 2022 -- in November 2022 French basketball federation president Jean-Pierre Siutat said: "he will no longer be there (in the France national team). It’s over."

Career statistics

EuroLeague

|-
| style="text-align:left;"| 2011–12
| style="text-align:left;" rowspan=4| Baskonia
| 10 || 4 || 11.4 || .389 || .235 || .500 || .8 || 1.0 || .1 || .0 || 3.3 || 1.7
|-
| style="text-align:left;"| 2012–13
| 28 || 20 || 20.4 || .484 || .437 || .690 || 2.1 || 4.5 || .7 || .0 || 7.2 || 9.1
|-
| style="text-align:left;"| 2013–14
| 21 || 19 || 25.8 || .429 || .235 || .786 || 2.1 || 5.3 || .7 || .0 || 8.0 || 9.8
|-
| style="text-align:left;" rowspan=2| 2014–15
| 10 || 6 || 28.3 || .532 || .563 || .786 || 2.8 || 6.7 || .9 || .0 || 12.2 || 16.2
|-
| style="text-align:left;" rowspan=3| Anadolu Efes
| 18 || 9 || 24.0 || .418 || .393 || .826 || 2.4 || 6.2 || .6 || .1 || 9.4 || 10.8
|-
| style="text-align:left;"| 2015–16
| 24 || 15 || 27.4 || .498 || .427 || .803 || 2.9 || style="background:#cfecec;"|7.9 || .8 || .0 || 12.7 || 17.3
|-
| style="text-align:left;"| 2016–17
| 35 || 6 || 26.3 || .456 || .337 || .867 || 1.7 || 5.6 || .8 || .0 || 12.7 || 12.5
|-
| style="text-align:left;"| 2017–18
| style="text-align:left;" rowspan=2| Barcelona 
| 30 || 22 || 23.6 || .500 || .348 || .814 || 2.4 || 6.4 || .7 || .0 || 11.3 || 13.9
|-
| style="text-align:left;"| 2018–19
| 35 || 19 || 21.1 || .477 || .450 || .753 || 1.9 || 4.8 || .7 || .0 || 10.4 || 11.1
|- class="sortbottom"
|colspan=2 style="text-align:center;"| Career
| 211 || 120 || 24.1 || .462 || .380 || .807 || 2.1 || 5.6 || .7 || .0 || 9.9 || 11.6
|}

References

External links
Thomas Heurtel at acb.com 
Thomas Heurtel at eurobasket.com
Thomas Heurtel at euroleague.net
Thomas Heurtel  at draftexpress.com
Thomas Heurtel at tblstat.net
Thomas Heurtel at fiba.com (archive)

1989 births
Living people
2014 FIBA Basketball World Cup players
Anadolu Efes S.K. players
ASVEL Basket players
Basketball players at the 2016 Summer Olympics
Basketball players at the 2020 Summer Olympics
CB Lucentum Alicante players
Élan Béarnais players
FC Barcelona Bàsquet players
French expatriate basketball people in Spain
French expatriate basketball people in Turkey
French men's basketball players
Liga ACB players
Medalists at the 2020 Summer Olympics
Olympic basketball players of France
Olympic medalists in basketball
Olympic silver medalists for France
Point guards
Real Madrid Baloncesto players
Saski Baskonia players
SIG Basket players
Sportspeople from Béziers